See also Hank Williams discography.
This list contains cover songs recorded by American singer-songwriter Hank Williams and the composer(s).  The songs are arranged alphabetically.


A
Aunt Dinah's Quilting Party (Trad.)

B
Beneath that Lonely Mound of Clay (Roy Acuff)

C
Cool Water (Bob Nolan)

D
The Devil's Train (Cliff Carlisle/Mel Foree)
Dixie Cannonball (Gene Autry/Vaughan Horton)
Don't Do It, Darling (Zeke Manners)
Drifting Too Far from the Shore (Charles Moody)

F
First Year Blues (Ernest Tubb)
Fool About You (Ralph C. Hutcheson)

H
Happy Rovin' Cowboy (Bob Nolan)

I
I Ain't Gonna Love You Anymore (Ernest Tubb)
I Cried Again (Autry Inman)
I'm Free at Last (Ernest Tubb)
It Just Don't Matter Now (Ernest Tubb)

J
Jesus Walked that Lonesome Valley (Trad.)

L
The Last Letter (Rex Griffin)
Let the Spirit Descend (J.M. Purdom)
The Little Paper Boy (Johnnie Wright/Jack Anglin)

M
My Main Trial Is Yet to Come (Pee Wee King/J.L. Frank)

O
The Old Country Church (John Whitfield Vaughan)
The Old Home (J.W. Earls)
Old Shep (Red Foley)

P
The Prodigal Son (Fred Rose)

R
Rock My Cradle Once Again (Johnny Bond)
Rockin' Alone in an Old Rockin' Chair (Bob Miller)
Rockin' Chair Money (Lonnie Glosson/Bill Carlisle)
Roly Poly (Fred Rose)

S
San Antonio Rose (Bob Wills)
Sundown and Sorrow (Pee Wee King/J.L. Frank)
Swing Wide Your Gate of Love (Hank Thompson)

T
Ten Little Numbers (Roy Acuff)
Tennessee Border (Jimmie Work)
Tramp on the Street (Grady Cole/Hazel Cole)

W
Wait For the Light to Shine (Fred Rose)
When God Dips His Love in My Heart (Cleavant Derricks)
Wild Side of Life (Arlie Carter/Williams Warren)
Will the Circle Be Unbroken (Trad.)

Y
You Caused It All by Telling Lies (Clyde Moody)

References

Williams, Hank